Wonderland Park was the third and final album of Los Angeles band Ednaswap. It had a much more pop-oriented sound than any of their other releases. It was released after the band's label, Island, underwent a reorganization that threatened Ednaswap's signed status.

Track listing
1. "Safety Net"  – 4:44 (Scott Cutler/Anne Preven) 
2. "Back on the Sun"  – 4:14 (Scott Cutler/Anne Preven)
3. "Liquid Soul"  – 2:56 (Rusty Anderson/Paul Bushnell/Scott Cutler/Anne Preven)
4. "74 Willow"  – 4:25 (Scott Cutler/Anne Preven)
5. "Without Within"  – 4:10 (Rusty Anderson/Paul Bushnell/Scott Cutler/Anne Preven)
6. "A Conversation"  – 3:40 (Scott Cutler/Anne Preven)
7. "Supernatural"  – 4:01 (Scott Cutler/Anne Preven)
8. "Trivial"  – 3:47 (Scott Cutler/Anne Preven)
9. "Flower"  – 4:28 (Scott Cutler/Anne Preven)
10. "747"  – 4:09 (Scott Cutler/Anne Preven)
11. "Invisible"  – 4:25 (Scott Cutler/Anne Preven)

Personnel
Produced by Scott Cutler
Co-Produced by Anne Preven
except Liquid Soul, Without Within and 747 produced by Scott Cutler and Ednaswap
Engineered by Scott Cutler, Steve Churchyard, Bryan Carlstrom and Rusty Anderson
assisted by Alan Sanderson, Kenny Ybarra
Mixed by Brian Malouf
except Back on the Sun and Safety Net mixed by Ken Andrews
Mastered by Ted Jensen
Cover photo by Marina Chavez
Inside photos by Kate Romero
Artwork by Anna Kalinka and Suppasak Viboonlarp

References

1998 albums
Ednaswap albums
Island Records albums